is a swimming venue in Kōtō, Tokyo, Japan. The swimming centre has hosted several Japanese swimming championships.

History
The swimming complex was designed by the Environment Design Institute, a Tokyo architecture firm. It was commissioned by the Bureau of Port and Harbour, a unit of the Tokyo Metropolitan Government. The building is built largely of steel-reinforced concrete except for the roof, which is a steel pipe space-truss structure. The structural design was by Kozo Keikaku Engineering. The complex was substantially completed in March 1993.

The swimming centre was used for the water polo events at the 2020 Summer Olympics, with the name Tatsumi Water Polo Centre.

World records broken in the TTISC

Long course
200 m breaststroke 2:07.51 Kosuke Kitajima; 8 June 2008
200 m breaststroke 2:06.67 Ippei Watanabe; 29 January 2017

Short course
200 m butterfly 2:03.12 Yūko Nakanishi; 23 February 2008

References

External links

 Official website

Sports venues in Tokyo
Swimming venues in Japan
Buildings and structures in Koto, Tokyo
Sports venues completed in 1993
1993 establishments in Japan
Venues of the 2020 Summer Olympics
Olympic water polo venues